Barbora Krejčíková and An-Sophie Mestach were the defending champions, but Mestach decided not to participate this year. Krejčíková partnered with María Irigoyen, but lost in the semifinals to Alla Kudryavtseva and Alexandra Panova.

Andrea Hlaváčková and Lucie Hradecká won the title, defeating Kudryavtseva and Panova 7–6(7–2), 7–6(7–2) in the final.

Seeds

Draw

References
Main Draw

Coupe Banque Nationale
Tournoi de Québec
2016 in Canadian tennis